Kajang is a town in Hulu Langat District, Selangor, Malaysia. Kajang, along with much of Hulu Langat District, is governed by the Kajang Municipal Council. Kajang town is located on the eastern banks of the Langat River. It is surrounded by Cheras, Semenyih, Bangi, Putrajaya and Serdang.

According to the 2020 census, the local authority area (which includes Kajang) has a population of 1.05 million people.

Etymology 
The name Kajang is believed to have originated from the language of Temuan tribes (Orang Asli) who populated the Langat valley in the 17th-18th centuries. In their language kajang referred to their art of weaving screwpine or pandanus leaves, which were prevalent in much of the country. A similar theory stated that settlers from the neighboring domain of Sungai Ujong (Negeri Sembilan) once constructed huts (pondok) in the area with thatched roof made from folded (lipat kajang) screwpine leaves.

It is also believed that the name kajang may have originated from the Buginese word berkajang, meaning camp or accommodation.

Geography and development 
Kajang is about half an hour's drive from Kuala Lumpur's central business district, primarily through Jalan Cheras and the Grand Saga Expressway; both routes are part of the Malaysia Federal Route 1 system.

In recent years, a few townships were developed in Kajang, such as Taman Prima Saujana, Sungai Chua and Taman Kajang Perdana (Kajang Highlands). High-end developments in Kajang include Twin Palms, Sri Banyan, Country Heights, Jade Hills, TTDI Grove, Tropicana Heights and Prima Paramount. Areas surrounding these townships are accessible via the SILK Expressway.

History 
Orang Asli tribes had already established settlements in what is now Kajang as early as the 16th century, however the first recorded settlement was found in 1709 by additional Orang Asli settlers who relocated from the Klang valley. Kajang town in its present form was founded in the 1870s, in the aftermath of the Klang War. In its early days, it was settled by Mandailings and Minangkabau people from Sumatra in the then-Dutch East Indies, followed by Chinese tin miners.

As with other towns in Selangor, Kajang as a modern town owes its rise in particular to tin mines and plantations which were opened around the 1890s. One of the famous coffee estates were Inch Kenneth Estate managed by the Kindersley brothers, who were among the first to plant rubber in the country on a commercial basis.During the Japanese invasion, Kajang was bombed on 12 January 1942, a day after the fall of Kuala Lumpur. The bombs, meant for the railway station, missed its target, and hit a nearby church instead.

In 1948 a pro-independence uprising called the Malayan Emergency was sparked against British forces and their allies across Malaya, with much of the fighting spreading to Kajang. Following the assassination of leading guerrilla Lau Yew, British forces photographed his corpse and printed the image onto leaflets to distribute around Kajang.

Kajang was granted municipal status on 1 January 1997. Previously it was under the jurisdiction of the Hulu Langat District Council (Majlis Daerah Hulu Langat, MDHL). Kajang was the administrative centre of the Hulu Langat region until it was relocated to Bandar Baru Bangi in 1992.

Demographics 
Kajang's population of 342,657 is 60.4% Malay, 19.3% Chinese, 9.7% Indians, and 10.6% other ethnic groups.

Kajang's main population centres are Sg. Sekamat, Taman Saujana Impian, Sg. Kantan, Sg. Jelok, Sg. Ramal, Sungai Chua, Jalan Reko, Jalan Bukit, Taman Jenaris, Taman Prima Saujana, Taman Kantan Permai, Taman Kajang Perdana, Taman Sri Ramal, Taman Bukit Mewah, Kajang Prima, Bandar Teknologi Kajang, Hillpark and Bandar Baru Bangi.

Landmarks 

The city centre of Kajang is the colonial quarter near the Stadium Kajang MRT station, including the streets of Jalan Mendaling, Jalan Stadium, Jalan Sulaiman and Jalan Raja Haroun. The buildings in the area were constructed around the 1900s to 1930s. The architecture of these shophouses is a combination of traditional Chinese and European designs. The ground floor was used mostly for commercial activities and the upper floor as the family living quarters.One of Kajang's landmarks is Kajang Stadium which is situated in the heart of the town. The stadium can accommodate up to 5,000 people and is used throughout the year for the community soccer competitions.

Another landmark is the Kajang Jamek Mosque, which is recognisable by its bright yellow facade.

Transportation

Car 
Kajang is served by a network of tolled expressways and federal highways.

Highway 1, the premier north–south federal highway of Peninsular Malaysia, runs through downtown Kajang and then southwards until Johor Bahru. On Highway 1, Kajang is 22 km from Kuala Lumpur and 43 km from Seremban.

A stretch of highway 1 is concurrent with the Cheras-Kajang toll road (aka the Grand Saga Expressway) between Taman Connaught and Bukit Dukung. The SILK Expressway starts in Serdang, which then runs through Balakong and then forms a beltway around downtown Kajang before ending near Bandar Baru Bangi. It is the main ring road for Kajang.

PLUS Expressway exit 210 serves the vicinity of Kajang and Bangi.

From Ampang Jaya, one can reach Kajang with state routes B62 and B52.

Public transport 
  Kajang railway station is the principal rail station of Kajang. It is an interchange station between the  MRT Kajang Line,  KTM Seremban Line and  KTM ETS. The station is the southern terminal of the MRT line.

Kajang station, though so named, does not directly serve downtown Kajang; Stadium Kajang MRT is located in the actual downtown area, along with Sungai Jernih MRT.

Food and tourism 

Kajang is famous for its sate,  a form of skewered barbecued meat. Informally, Kajang is known as the Sate Town.

Government and infrastructure 
The Malaysia Prison Complex (Kompleks Penjara Kajang), headquarters of the Prison Department of Malaysia is in Kajang.

Shopping 

Kajang has multiple shopping complexes. The Billion Shopping Center formerly in Kajang town and now it is relocated to Bandar Teknologi Kajang. Other shopping centres located are Plaza Metro Kajang, Metro Point and Kompleks Kota Kajang. Metro Avenue is a new shopping district located opposite SMJK Yu Hua Kajang and Kajang High School.

Facilities and amenities 
Hospital Kajang is the primary public hospital in the city.

Private medical centres function 24 hours and include facilities such as Poliklinik MUC @Metro Point, Klinik Mediviron Prima Saujana, Kajang Plaza Medical Centre (KPMC) and KPJ Kajang Specialist Hospital.

The Hulu Langat District Police Headquarters are located in the town centre, across the Highway 1 junction from the Post Office. Federal government agencies with their branch in Kajang include the National Registration Department, Immigration Department, Transportation Department, and Hulu Langat Education Office.

Education

Primary 
 Al-Amin Sungai Tangkas
 Rafflesia International School Kajang 2
 SK Bandar Seri Putra
 SK Jalan Bukit 1
 SK Jalan Bukit 2
 SK Jalan Semenyih 1
 SK Jalan Semenyih 2
 SK Kajang
 SK Kajang Utama
 SK Kantan Permai
 SK Leftenan Adnan
 SK Saujana Impian
 SK Saujana Impian 2
 SK Seri Sekamat
 SK Taman Jasmin
 SK Taman Sri Jelok
 SRJK(C) Yu Hua
 SRJK(C) Yu Hua 2 (under construction)
 SRJK(C) Sungai Chua
 SRJK(T) Kajang
 Tanarata International Schools
 SK Convent Kajang
 SK Taman Rakan

Secondary 
 Rafflesia International School@Kajang 2
 SMK Convent Kajang
 SM Integrasi Tahfiz Ilmuwan Bangi
 SM Rafflesia@Kajang 2
 SM Teknik Kajang
 SMAP Kajang
 SMJK Yu Hua Kajang
 SMK Jalan Bukit
 SMK Jalan Reko
 SMK Kajang Utama
 SMK Saujana Impian
 SMK Sultan Abdul Aziz Shah (SAAS)
 SMK Sungai Ramal (SEMARAK)
 SMK Taman Jasmin 2
 SMK Tinggi Kajang (Kajang High School)
 SMKA Maahad Hamidiah
 Tanarata International Schools

Tertiary 
Kajang is home to institutions of higher learning, which includes:
 Universiti Tunku Abdul Rahman (UTAR) Sungai Long Campus
 Universiti Tenaga Nasional
 Infrastructure University Kuala Lumpur
 New Era University College
 German-Malaysian Institute
 Universiti Kuala Lumpur Malaysia France Institute (MFI)
 Universiti Kuala Lumpur Medical Science and Technology (MESTECH)

Politics 

After the 2018 Malaysian general election,  became part of the  parliamentary constituency in the Dewan Rakyat of the Malaysian Parliament. The seat is held by Syahredzan Johan from PH-DAP.

The incumbent Assemblyperson for Kajang is Hee Loy Sian from PH-PKR.

Until 9 May 2018, Kajang was part of the  parliamentary constituency in the Dewan Rakyat of the Malaysian Parliament.

Notable people 

 Lt Adnan Bin Saidi, Malayan military officer who took part in the Battle of Singapore, Bukit Chandu during World War II.
 Datuk Ramli bin Ibrahim, Malaysian choreographer.
 Ning Baizura, singer.
 Nora Danish, actress.
 Suresh Navaratnam, Malaysian cricketer, represented Malaysia for 21 years and captained the National Team.
 K. Sanbagamaran, former Selangor FA and Malaysia national football team player.
 Jonathan Ramachandran, represented Malaysia for International Mathematical Olympiad.
 D. Christie Jayaseelan, football player.
 K. Reuben, football player.
 Safee Sali, football player.

References

External links 

 Kajang Municipal Council Official Website

 
Mukims of Selangor
Towns in Selangor